William Leary may refer to:
 William H. Leary (1881–1957), dean of the University of Utah College of Law
 William J. Leary (1931–2018), American school administrator and academic
 William M. Leary (1934–2006), American academic and aviation historian

See also
 William O'Leary (disambiguation)